This is a discography of albums by Namibian musician The Dogg. The Dogg began his professional music career in 2003. He released two solo studio albums in 2004.

Albums

Solo

Collaboration/compilation

Production discography
Below is list of albums on which The Dogg has produced.

Awards 
Below is a list of awards by The Dogg. The Dogg has participated in professional awards since the inception of his career in 2003. He holds more awards than any other Namibian musician. He has won the Sanlam-NBC Music Awards "Artist of the Year" award 4 times.

Notes

Hip hop discographies
Discographies of Namibian artists